WGCU (channel 30) is a PBS member television station licensed to Fort Myers, Florida, United States, and also serving Naples and Cape Coral. Owned by Florida Gulf Coast University, it is a sister station to NPR member WGCU-FM (90.1). The two stations share studios on the Florida Gulf Coast University campus in Fort Myers and transmitter facilities in unincorporated southern Charlotte County.

History
The station first signed on the air on August 15, 1983 as WSFP-TV. It was originally owned by the University of South Florida in Tampa, owners of Tampa Bay's secondary PBS member station, WUSF-TV (now WEDQ), and primary NPR member WUSF-FM. At the time, the Fort Myers–Naples area was the only media market in Florida without a public television station of any sort that was available over-the-air. Fort Myers–Naples area cable providers usually piped WEDU in Tampa or WPBT in Miami, depending on the location. WSFP-TV operated as a typical PBS member station.

The WSFP broadcast license was transferred to the new Florida Gulf Coast University in 1996, while construction on the university's campus was being completed. The station then changed its call letters to WGCU on August 11, 1997, two months before FGCU opened.

For much of the first two decades as a locally-focused station, WGCU identified as "TV 3," after its location on most area cable systems; this was a nod to the exceptionally high penetration of cable and satellite in Southwest Florida. Since 2017, however, it has identified solely with its call letters. For several years, WGCU was also carried on cable in Sarasota, which the station long claimed as part of its primary coverage area (despite being part of the Tampa Bay market).

Digital channels
The station's digital signal is multiplexed:

Analog-to-digital conversion
WGCU shut down its analog signal, on UHF channel 30, on June 12, 2009, the official date in which full-power television stations in the United States transitioned from analog to digital broadcasts under federal mandate. The station's digital signal continued to broadcasts on its pre-transition UHF channel 31. Through the use of PSIP, digital television receivers display the station's virtual channel as its former UHF analog channel 30.

Programming
National programming on WGCU comes from PBS, American Public Television, and other distributors, as well as from independent producers.

References

External links
WGCU Public Media

PBS member stations
1983 establishments in Florida
Television channels and stations established in 1983
GCU (TV)
Florida Gulf Coast University